Bartolomea Riccoboni (ca 1369–1440) was a Dominican nun in the convent of Corpus Domini in Venice. She wrote a chronicle of the convent, and a necrology. She has been studied as a good example of the beginnings of women's writings in the late medieval mendicant orders. In addition to matters relating to her own convent, she records the events of the Papal Schism, in which she is an adherent of Gregory XII.

Notes

1440 deaths
Dominican nuns
15th-century Venetian writers
Year of birth uncertain
15th-century Venetian women
14th-century Italian women writers
15th-century Italian women writers